was a Japanese amateur Go player.

Biography
Kikuchi founded the prestigious Ryokusei Academy in 1975, which has become one of the most prolific Go schools in Japan. Some of the most famous players to come out of the academy include Kikuyo Aoki (current Women's Meijin), Atsushi Kato, Jiro Akiyama, Tomochika Mizokami (winner of many youth titles), and Keigo Yamashita (four times Kisei). Kikuchi's other students include Shinichi Aoki, Ryuichi Muramatsu, Keiichi Tsurumaru, Yoshimichi Suzuki, Atsushi Katsura, Ko Reibun.

He has won many amateur titles, his biggest coming in 1992 when he won the World Amateur Go Championship. He also came in third place at the 2003 competition. He still actively participated in professional Go competitions that allow amateurs to enter, such as the Meijin Tournament where he won games in 2001. In 2003, he beat Ryu Shikun by resignation in the Agon Cup at the age of 73.

Bibliography

Notes

External links
Sensei's Library page
Gogameworld page
Murakami Akahide as pupil

1929 births
2021 deaths
Japanese Go players
Go (game) writers
People from Ōta, Tokyo